Mucker or Muckers may refer to:
 Muckers, the nickname of a group in Pietism, followers of certain theologians
 The Muckers, a football hooligan firm linked to the football club Blackpool F.C.
 The Mucker, novel by Edgar Rice Burroughs
 Grinder (ice hockey), a style of player
 Muckers (game), also known as "ring toss"
 Larry Mucker (born 1954), American footballer
 An alternative name for a Rocker Shovel Loader